Zagroble may refer to the following places:
Zagroble, Biłgoraj County in Lublin Voivodeship (east Poland)
Zagroble, Hrubieszów County in Lublin Voivodeship (east Poland)
Zagroble, Subcarpathian Voivodeship (south-east Poland)